Tatyana Leonidovna Veshkurova (born 23 September 1981) is a Russian sprint athlete.

She won the silver medal in the 400m at the 2006 European Athletics Championships in Gothenburg, as well as a gold medal in the 4 x 400 m relay.

References

Results page at rusathletics.com

1981 births
Living people
Sportspeople from Perm, Russia
Russian female sprinters
Olympic female sprinters
Olympic athletes of Russia
Athletes (track and field) at the 2008 Summer Olympics
Competitors stripped of Summer Olympics medals
World Athletics Championships athletes for Russia
World Athletics Indoor Championships winners
European Athletics Championships winners
European Athletics Championships medalists
Russian Athletics Championships winners